Nowhere Boys: The Book of Shadows is a 2016 Australian dark fantasy teen drama film directed by David Caesar. It is based on the teen-oriented television series Nowhere Boys created by Tony Ayres, who also co-wrote the film.

Plot synopsis
Picking up one year after the boys crossed dimensions, discovered magic and battled restoring demons. Having grown apart, they are all brought back together again when Felix discovers the magically sealed Book of Shadows that unwittingly unleashes a very powerful force of chaos. The boys are then reluctantly drawn into a battle that threatens both their world and their loved ones.

Cast
 Dougie Baldwin as Felix Ferne
 Joel Lok as Andrew "Andy" Lau
 Rahart Adams as Sam Conte
 Matt Testro as Jake Riles
 Sean Rees-Wemyss as Oscar Ferne
 Angourie Rice as Tegan
 Michala Banas as Phoebe
 Lester Ellis Jr. as Pete
 Darci McDonald as Ellen
 Giovanni Piccolo as Teacher
 Tamala Shelton as Mia
 Victoria Thaine as Alice
 Ben Keller as Bear

Production
On 23 December 2014, it was announced that Screen Australia would be funding a movie based on the television series titled, Nowhere Boys: The Rise of the Bear. However, in July 2015, it was revealed that the movie's name was changed to Nowhere Boys: The Book of Shadows. The 80-minute feature-length movie was directed by David Caesar and written by Tony Ayres, Rhys Graham and Craig Irvin. It was produced by Beth Frey and executive produced by Ayres and Michael McMahon. Nowhere Boys: The Book of Shadows picks up a year after the boys crossed dimensions, discovered magic and battled the restoring demon. Having grown apart, they are drawn together again when Felix discovers a magically sealed Book of Shadows, which unwittingly releases a powerful force of chaos. The boys are reluctantly drawn into a showdown that threatens their world and loved ones.

Dougie Baldwin, Joel Lok, Rahart Adams, Matt Testro, and Sean Rees-Wemyss reprised their roles as Felix, Andy, Sam, Jake, and Oscar. Others who also returned for the movie included series regulars Darci McDonald (Ellen), Michala Banas (Phoebe), Victoria Thaine (Alice), Ben Keller (Bear), Tamala Shelton (Mia) and Michelle Gerster (Viv). Angourie Rice joined the cast. Nowhere Boys: The Book of Shadows began filming in Melbourne in July 2015. It screened in selected Australian movie theatres on 1 January 2016 and had its television premiere on ABC3 on 6 March 2016.

Home media
Nowhere Boys: The Book of Shadows was released on DVD 6 March 2016.

References

External links
 Nowhere Boys: The Book of Shadows at Internet Movie Database

2016 films
Australian fantasy films
Australian science fiction films
2010s English-language films